Cargolux, legally Cargolux Airlines International S.A., is a Luxembourgian flag carrier cargo airline with its headquarters and hub at Luxembourg Airport. With a global network, it is one of the largest scheduled all-cargo airlines in Europe. Charter flights and third party maintenance are also operated. It has 85 offices in over 50 countries as of 2018, and operates a global trucking network to more than 250 destinations.

History

The airline was established in March 1970 by Luxair, the Salen Shipping Group, Loftleiðir, and various private interests in Luxembourg. Einar Olafsson was the airline's first employee and CEO. It started operations in May 1970 with one Canadair CL-44 freighter with services from Luxembourg to Hong Kong. Over the next two years, the airline grew, as did its public visibility.

By 1973, Cargolux had five CL-44s and made the leap into the jet age by acquiring a Douglas DC-8. This enabled the company to speed up its cargo deliveries. In 1974, Loftleiðir and Cargolux amalgamated their maintenance and engineering departments, and by 1975, Cargolux enjoyed new facilities consisting of central offices and two hangars.

In 1978, the airline began to take shape into the company it is today.  The CL-44s began to be retired and the airline ordered its first Boeing 747s. In that same year it also began flying to other places in Asia, as well as to the United States. In 1979, as the company concluded its first decade, its first Boeing 747s were delivered.

In 1982, China Airlines became the first airline company to sign a strategic alliance with Cargolux.

1983 saw the introduction of the CHAMP (Cargo Handling and Management Planning) computer system and the start of some charter passenger flights for the Hajj pilgrimage.

1984 saw the departure of the last Douglas DC-8 in the fleet and the addition of a third Boeing 747. Lufthansa bought a 24.5% share of the airline in 1987 and Luxair increased its share to 24.53%.

1988 saw the birth of Lion Air, a passenger charter airline established by both Cargolux and Luxair. The airline had two Boeing 747s but Cargolux's venture into the charter airline world proved unsuccessful and soon Lion Air folded.

Despite that setback, Cargolux made it into the 1990s in proper financial shape. It added two more Boeing 747s in 1990, as a way of celebrating its 20th anniversary, and in 1993, three Boeing 747-400Fs arrived at Luxembourg. In 1995 Cargolux had a year-long celebration of its 25th anniversary and Heiner Wilkens was named CEO and President.

In 1997, Luxair was able to increase its share to 34%, while in September that year Lufthansa sold its 24.5% stake to Sair Logistics; and Swissair Cargo made a cooperation agreement with the Luxembourg company. The following year Sair Logistics increased its share to 33%.

By 1999, Cargolux's fleet had reached double figures, with 10 Boeing 747s. In 2000 a route was opened to Seoul, South Korea, and in 2001 Wilkens decided to step down as president and CEO of the air company.

In October 2010, Ulrich Ogiermann, the chief executive officer of Cargolux was indicted on suspicion of price-fixing; After pleading guilty, he was sentenced to 13 months in federal prison. In November 2010, Cargolux was fined for price-fixing by the European Commission.

On 8 September 2011, Qatar Airways purchased a 35% share in the company making it the second largest shareholder after Luxair (43.4%). The other shareholders were the Banque et Caisse d'Epargne de l'Etat (10.9%) and the Société Nationale de Crédit et d'Investissement (10.7%). In November 2012 Qatar Airways announced plans to sell its stake after strategic differences with other major shareholders such as whether the interim CEO and CFO, Richard Forson, should become the permanent CEO. Unions had claimed Forson was effectively a Qatar Airways representative after comments he made about relocating maintenance to the Middle East and rumours of plans for aircraft to be re-registered in Qatar. Qatar Airways sold its share to the Government of Luxembourg, which then sold that share to Henan Civil Aviation Development and Investment, a Chinese company, in 2014. As part of that agreement, Cargolux launched a 
service from Luxembourg to Zhengzhou in Henan. In 2017, Cargolux entered into a joint venture with Henan Civil Aviation Development and Investment to create Henan Cargo Airlines, and holds a 25% stake in the operation.

On 17 September 2011 Cargolux announced that it would not accept the first two Boeing 747-8F aircraft it had ordered, scheduled for delivery within a few days, due to "unresolved contractual issues between Boeing and [the airline]" concerning the aircraft.
After resolving their contractual issues, Boeing handed over the first 747-8F to Cargolux in Everett, Washington on 12 October 2011. The freighter then flew to Seattle–Tacoma International Airport and picked up cargo before flying to Luxembourg.

Cargo 2000 — an industry group within the International Air Transport Association (IATA) consisting of some 80 major airlines, freight forwarders, ground handling agents, trucking companies and IT providers — announced on 15 March 2012 at its annual general meeting, that Cargolux Airlines International S.A. had gained Cargo 2000 platinum membership status.

In June, 2020, Cargolux and Unilode extended their partnership with a new agreement.

Destinations
Cargolux covers 90 destinations, and 70 of which are served on scheduled all-cargo flights as of 2018.

Fleet

Current fleet

As of September 2021, Cargolux operates an all Boeing 747 fleet:

Former fleet 
Cargolux formerly operated the following aircraft:

Accidents and incidents

2 December 1970: A Canadair CL-44J, (registration TF-LLG) owned by Cargolux Airlines S.A. crashed on approach to Dacca when controls lock system engaged. 7 casualties resulted, the 4 crew members and 3 ground casualties.
On 21 January 2010, Cargolux Flight 7933 touched the roof of a maintenance vehicle that was still on the active runway during LVP. There was one light injury and no fatalities in this incident. Three investigations were launched into the accident. The cause was attributed to ATC failing to ensure and check that their instruction to the ground vehicle were obeyed. 
On 30 March 2017, a Cargolux Boeing 747-8F (registration LX-VCF) operating as Flight 775 arrived at Prestwick Airport near Glasgow in Scotland carrying a Bell 412EP helicopter from Houston, Texas. The helicopter was observed to have leaked fuel into the cargo hold, reportedly amounting to more than 300 litres. The fuel leaked into the avionics bay and caused substantial damage. The aircraft returned to service a month later.
On June 19, 2021, Cargolux plane LX-VCE a Boeing 747-8F clipped the wing of a Southwest Airlines Boeing 737-700 (Registration N218WN) at Chicago OHare Airport, both flights were Immediately canceled, the Cargolux plane suffered little to no damage but the Southwest 737 suffered a broken winglet, Cargolux LX-VCE flew back to Luxembourg on June 21, 2021.

References

External links

Cargolux 50, the company's 50th-anniversary retrospective

Airlines of Luxembourg
Airlines established in 1970
Association of European Airlines members
Airlines for Europe
Cargo airlines
Companies based in Luxembourg City
1970 in Luxembourg